Nizhny Pochinok is a rural locality (a village) in Nikolskoye Rural Settlement, Kaduysky District, Vologda Oblast, Russia. The population was 14 as of 2002.

Geography 
Nizhny Pochinok is located 22 km northeast of Kaduy (the district's administrative centre) by road. Myza is the nearest rural locality.

References 

Rural localities in Kaduysky District